The Battle of San Andrés, also known as the Charge at San Andrés was an battle of the Mexican Revolution and was fought on Augest 26–27, 1913. Revolutionary leader General Pancho Villa attacked the town of San Andrés, and concluded when the American soldier of fortune, charged the federal positions amd routed the enemy. 1,000 government soldiers were killed, and 400 prisoners were executed by Villa's self styled executioner, Rodolfo Fierro.

Battle

Throughout the summer of 1913 Villa was at the peake of his success, winning battles against president Victoriano Huerta and his army. His infamous division of the north had a strength of almost 50,000 tough, disciplined troops, loyal only to Villa, and although Venustiano Carranza was the nominal leader of the revolt, it was Villa and his men who did most of the fighting. In short order, Villa had captured Guerrero, Bustillos, and Cras Grandes.

In August 1913, Villa stationed his army outside the town of San Andrés, and on the 26th he launched his attack. Villa dispatched the head of his bodyguard and commander of the "Dorados", Julio Cárdenas to lead the assault with the infantry. The fighting lasted all day and the rebels were unable to force his way into the city because of effective fire from the federal artillery, while Cárdenas was wounded and he and his men had to withdrawal to the safety of the rebel lines.

In next day on the 27th, Villa ordered his machine gun detachments under the command of the American soldier of fortune, Major E.L Holmdahl. Holmdahl's men formed a firing line and began bombarding the enemy trenches, but as darkness was about to descend, and due to Villa's willingness to decisively conclude the battle, he ordered one of his famous cavarly charges. As Cárdenas had been wounded, Villa assigned Holmdahl to lead the attack. Holmdahl ordered an subnoridate to command his machine guns, while he rode to the front of the column to commence the charge. The bugler sounded the charge, and as the Dorados charged into the mouths of the cannons shouting "Viva Villa", Holmdahl one hand on the reins, the other on his .45 caliber revolver shouted and charged the Huertistas, while his hat was shot off by a shell fragment during the charge.

As the Dorados charged were nearing the trenches, Holmdahl was suddenly shot in the stomach and fell of his horse to the ground. Although Holmdahl was wounded, the cavalry reached the federal positions and quickly overan the trenches and routed the enemy from the field. The federals had lost 1,000 dead and 400 captured, as well as losing more than fifty artillery pieces, 400 Mauser rifles, 20,000 rounds of ammunition and seven railroad trains loaded with food, medical supplies, and uniforms.

The glory of victory was soured with the brutal murders of captured troops. According to one of Villas wives, Luz Corral, Orozco sympathizers, had poisoned her daughter. Villa as an outraged father, cried out for vengeance and turned the prisoners over to his faithful killer, Rodolfo Fierro, who called himself a frugal executioner. Fierro lined up more than four hundred helpless prisoners in groups of three. Forcing them to hug each other back-to-front, Fierro then strode down their lines firing one shot from a high-powered pistol into each trio, fatally drilling all three bodies in a single shot. Fierro would giggle to Villa "Look how much ammunition I saved."

Aftermath

The battle broke the back of federal forces in the stats and was a major victory for Villa and his men. Holmdahl, for his part was promoted to Colonel at only age 29, and later awarded an honorary legion of honor. A contemporary pamphlet described Holmdahl's charge as heroic and bold, noting that his courage should be memorialized in marble and bronze. Martín Luis Guzmán, a Mexican Journalist, novelist, and historian credited Holmdahl with winning the battle.

References

Sources

Guzmán, Luis Guzmán. Memoirs of Pancho Villa.
"Victorias Del General Villa" (Victories With General Villa) T.F. Serrano and C. Del Vando. El Paso, Texas, 1913.

Mexican Revolution
1913 in Mexico
August 1913 events
Battles of the Mexican Revolution